Henry Morgenthau (April 26, 1856 – November 25, 1946) was a German-born American lawyer and businessman, best known for his role as the ambassador to the Ottoman Empire during World War I. Morgenthau was one of the most prominent Americans who spoke about the Greek genocide and the Armenian genocide of which he stated, "I am firmly convinced that this is the greatest crime of the ages".

Morgenthau was the father of the politician Henry Morgenthau Jr. His grandchildren include Robert M. Morgenthau, District Attorney of Manhattan for 35 years, and Barbara W. Tuchman, a historian who won the Pulitzer Prize for her book The Guns of August.

Early life and education
Morgenthau was born the ninth of 11 living children, in Mannheim, Baden (present-day Baden-Württemberg, Germany), in 1856 into an Ashkenazi Jewish family. He was the son of Lazarus and Babette (Guggenheim) Morgenthau. His father was a successful cigar manufacturer who had cigar factories at Mannheim, Lorsch and Heppenheim, employing as many as 1,000 people (Mannheim had a population of 21,000 during this period). His business suffered a severe financial setback during the American Civil War, due to an 1862 tobacco tariff on imports, which closed German tobacco exports to the US forever. 

The Morgenthau family immigrated to New York in 1866. There, despite considerable savings, his father was not able to re-establish himself in business. His development and marketing of various inventions and his investments in other enterprises failed. Lazarus Morgenthau staved off failure and stabilized his income by becoming a fundraiser for Jewish houses of worship. Henry attended City College of New York, where he received a BA, and later graduated from Columbia Law School.

Business career
He began his career as a lawyer, but he made a substantial fortune in real estate investments. In 1898, he acquired 41 lots on New York's Lower East Side from William Waldorf Astor for $850,000. A few years later, he led a syndicate that bought a swath of undeveloped land in Washington Heights around 181st Street, anticipating the construction of the first subway through the area.

Morgenthau married Josephine Sykes in 1882 and they had four children: Helen, Alma, Henry Jr. and Ruth. His daughter Helen - a noted garden writer who broadcast on radio & television and lectured on horticulture - married Mortimer J. Fox an architect, banker and landscape artist. His daughter Alma - an art collector and patron of the arts & music - married investment banker, art collector and philanthropist Maurice Wertheim. His daughter Ruth married banker and philanthropist George Washington Naumburg She was also a civic leader supporting the arts and music. Ruth founded Fountain House, a home in NYC to assist those with schizophrenia and men leaving jail. It was a residence that pioneered providing psychological counseling to people, and developed the novel concept of looking after the community's mental health. She was also a board member of the Manhattan School of Music, and there she established a fund to assist troubled students at the school, which still operates. In Pound Ridge, NY she co-founded the town's library and gave it an additional reading room, and then at her death, she donated the Henry Morgenthau Preserve, Pound Ridge, NY, in her father's memory.

Morgenthau built a successful career as a lawyer and served as the leader of the Reform Jewish community in New York.

Political career

Morgenthau's career enabled him to contribute handsomely to President Woodrow Wilson's election campaign in 1912. He had first met Wilson in 1911 at a dinner celebrating the fourth anniversary of the founding of the Free Synagogue society and the two "seem to have bonded", marking the "turning point in Morgenthau's political career". His role in American politics grew more pronounced in later months. Although he did not gain the chairmanship of Wilson's campaign finance committee, Morgenthau was offered the position of ambassador to the Ottoman Empire. He had hoped for a cabinet post as well, but was not successful in gaining one.

Ambassador to the Ottoman Empire

As an early Wilson supporter, Morgenthau assumed that Wilson would appoint him to a cabinet-level position, but the new President had other plans for him. Like other prominent Jewish Americans, Oscar Straus and Solomon Hirsch before him, Morgenthau was appointed as ambassador to the Ottoman Empire. Wilson's assumption that Jews somehow represented a bridge between Muslim Turks and Christian Armenians rankled Morgenthau; in reply Wilson assured him that the Porte in Constantinople "was the point at which the interest of American Jews in the welfare of the Jews of Palestine is focused, and it is almost indispensable that I have a Jew in that post".  Though no Zionist himself, Morgenthau cared "fervidly" about the plight of his co-religionists. He initially rejected the position, but following a trip to Europe, and with the encouragement of his pro-Zionist friend Rabbi Stephen Wise, he reconsidered his decision and accepted Wilson's offer. Appointed as U.S. Ambassador to the Ottoman Empire in 1913, he served in this position until 1916.

Although the safety of American citizens in the Ottoman Empire, mostly Christian missionaries and Jews, loomed large early in his ambassadorship, Morgenthau said that he was most preoccupied by the Armenian Question. After the outbreak of war in 1914, the U.S. remained neutral, so the American Embassy – and by extension Morgenthau – additionally represented many of the Allies' interests in Constantinople (Istanbul), since they had withdrawn their diplomatic missions due to the hostilities. As Ottoman authorities began the Armenian genocide in 1914–1915, the American consuls residing in different parts of the Empire flooded Morgenthau's desk with reports nearly every hour, documenting the massacres and deportation marches taking place. Faced with the accumulating evidence, he officially informed the U.S. government of the activities of the Ottoman government and asked Washington to intervene.

The American government however, not wanting to get dragged into disputes, remained a neutral power in the conflict at the time and voiced little official reaction. Morgenthau held high-level meetings with the leaders of the Ottoman Empire to help alleviate the position of the Armenians, but the Turks waived and ignored his protestations. He famously admonished the Ottoman Interior Minister Talaat Pasha, stating: "Our people will never forget these massacres." As the massacres continued unabated, Morgenthau and several other Americans decided to form a public fund-raising committee to assist the Armenians – the Committee on Armenian Atrocities (later renamed the Near East Relief) – raising over $100 million in aid, the equivalent of $1 billion today. Through his friendship with Adolph Ochs, publisher of the New York Times, Morgenthau also ensured that the massacres continued to receive prominent coverage. The New York Times published 145 articles in 1915 alone.

Exasperated with his relationship with the Ottoman government, he resigned from the ambassadorship in 1916. Looking back on that decision in his The Murder of a Nation, he wrote he had come to see the Ottoman Empire as "a place of horror. I had reached the end of my resources. I found intolerable my further daily association with men, however gracious and accommodating…who were still reeking with the blood of nearly a million human beings." He published his conversations with Ottoman leaders and his account of the Armenian genocide in 1918 under the title Ambassador Morgenthau's Story.

In June 1917 Felix Frankfurter accompanied Morgenthau, as a representative of the War Department, on a secret mission to persuade the Ottoman Empire to abandon the Central Powers in the war effort. The mission had as its stated purpose to "ameliorate the condition of the Jewish communities in Palestine". In 1918 Morgenthau gave public speeches in the United States warning that the Greeks and Assyrians were being subjected to the "same methods" of deportation and "wholesale massacre" as the Armenians, and that two million Armenians, Greeks, and Assyrians had already perished.

Interwar period
Following the war, there was much interest and preparation within the Jewish community for the forthcoming Paris Peace Conference, by groups both supportive and opposed to the concept of a Jewish homeland in Palestine.  In March 1919, as President Woodrow Wilson was leaving for the Conference, Morgenthau was among 31 prominent Jewish Americans to sign an anti-Zionist petition presented by U.S. Congressman Julius Kahn; he and many other prominent Jewish representatives attended the Conference. Morgenthau served as an advisor regarding Eastern Europe and the Middle East, and later worked with war-related charitable bodies, including the Relief Committee for the Middle East, the Greek Refugee Settlement Commission and the American Red Cross. In 1919, he headed the United States government fact-finding mission to Poland, which produced the Morgenthau Report. In 1933, he was the American representative at the Geneva Conference.

Death

Morgenthau died in 1946 following a cerebral hemorrhage, in New York City, and was buried in Hawthorne, New York, at the age of 90. His son Henry Morgenthau Jr. was a Secretary of the Treasury. His daughter, Alma Wertheim, was married to banker Maurice Wertheim and was the mother of historian Barbara Tuchman. His daughter Ruth Morgenthau was married to banker George W. Naumburg (son of Elkan Naumburg), and then John Knight.

Selected works
Morgenthau published several books. The Library of Congress holds some 30,000 documents from his personal papers, including:
 Ambassador Morgenthau's Story (1918). Garden City, N.Y.: Doubleday (online).
 The Secrets of the Bosphorus (1918) (online)
 The Morgenthau Report (October 3, 1919) concerning the plight of Jews in the Second Polish Republic.
 All In a Lifetime (Garden City, New York: Doubleday, Page & Co, 1925), 454 pages, 7 illustrations; featuring the Morgenthau Report (online, at Archive.org).
 I was sent to Athens (1929) deals with his time working with Greek refugees (openlibrary.org)
 The Murder of a Nation (1974). With preface by W. N. Medlicott. New York: Armenian General Benevolent Union of America.

 Diaries
 United States Diplomacy on the Bosphorus: The Diaries of Ambassador Morgenthau, 1913–1916 (2004). Compiled with an introduction by Ara Sarafian. London: Taderon Press (Gomidas Institute). .

 Official documents
 Ara Sarafian (ed.): United States Official Records On The Armenian Genocide. 1915–1917 (2004).  London and Princeton: Gomidas Institute.

Depictions
In Terry George's 2016 drama The Promise, set in the final years of the Ottoman Empire, Morgenthau is played by James Cromwell.

See also
 Leslie Davis, American diplomat and wartime US consul to Harput
 Witnesses and testimonies of the Armenian genocide

References

Further reading
Balakian, Peter (2003). The Burning Tigris: The Armenian Genocide and America's Response. New York: HarperCollins.
Morgenthau III, Henry (1991). Mostly Morgenthaus: A Family History. New York: Ticknor & Fields.
Oren, Michael B. (2007). Power, Faith, and Fantasy: America in the Middle East 1776 to the Present. New York: W. W. Norton & Co.
Power, Samantha (2002). A Problem from Hell: America and the Age of Genocide. New York: Basic Books.
Tuchman, Barbara. "The Assimilationist Dilemma: Ambassador Morgenthau's Story." Commentary. No. 5, 63, May 1977.

External links

 
 
 Henry Morgenthau Sr. at Flickr Commons
 
——. Ambassador Morgenthau's Story at the World War I Document Archive.
——. Ambassador Morgenthau's Story. With translations in French, German and Turkish.

 I was sent to Athens. An electronic copy of Morgenthau's book on the treatment of Greek refugees by the Ottoman Empire from 1913–1929.
 Native Christians Massacred: The Ottoman Genocide of the Assyrians during World War I.  Describes Ambassador Morgenthau's attempts to educate the American public about the genocide of the Armenians, Greeks, and Assyrians of Anatolia and Mesopotamia.

1856 births
1946 deaths
20th-century American businesspeople
20th-century American diplomats
20th-century American male writers
20th-century American non-fiction writers
Ambassadors of the United States to the Ottoman Empire
American foreign policy writers
American male non-fiction writers
American people of World War I
American real estate businesspeople
Burials in New York (state)
City College of New York alumni
Columbia Law School alumni
German emigrants to the United States
German Ashkenazi Jews
Jewish American government officials
Henry Sr.
Philhellenes
People from New York City
Witnesses of the Armenian genocide
Woodrow Wilson administration personnel
American Ashkenazi Jews